Muyres is a surname. Notable people with the surname include:

 Dallan Muyres (born 1987), Canadian curler 
 Kirk Muyres (born 1990), Canadian curler